Events in the year 2008 in Monaco.

Incumbents 
 Monarch: Albert II
 State Minister: Jean-Paul Proust

Events 

 25 May – Lewis Hamilton won the 2008 Monaco Grand Prix.

Deaths

See also 

 2008 in Europe
 City states

References 

 
Years of the 21st century in Monaco
2000s in Monaco
Monaco
Monaco